Lakelands Academy (formerly The Lakelands School) is a coeducational secondary school located in Ellesmere in the English county of Shropshire.

Previously a community school administered by Shropshire Council, The Lakelands School converted to academy status in December 2012. However the school continues to coordinate with Shropshire Council for admissions.

Lakelands Academy offers GCSEs and BTECs as programmes of study for pupils. In addition the school offers some vocational courses in conjunction with Walford and North Shropshire College. Pupils at Lakelands Academy also have the option to take part in the Duke of Edinburgh's Award programme.

Notable former pupils
Luke Preston, judoka

References

External links
Lakelands Academy official website

Secondary schools in Shropshire
Academies in Shropshire
Ellesmere, Shropshire